Northern Soul is a 2008 album by Canadian alternative rock band 54-40.  The album tracks were recorded at The Chapel and 604 in Vancouver, at Otter Point on Denman Island, and Ormond Street Studios in Victoria.  The album was self-produced by band members Dave Genn and Neil Osborne, and was mixed at The Warehouse Studios by Warne Livesey.

Track listing
 "The Chant" – 4:33
 "Snap" – 4:02
 "The Scare of Meaning Less" – 3:08
 "Northern Soul" – 4:11
 "Where Did the Money Go" – 3:51
 "One Hundred Songs" – 3:26
 "Shade Grows" – 3:35
 "Moonbeach" – 4:12
 "The Wind Down" – 3:43
 "To Face Your Eyes" – 3:16
 "Lucky" – 3:02

References

2008 albums
54-40 albums
True North Records albums
Albums produced by Warne Livesey